George A. Ferris & Son was an architectural firm in Reno, Nevada, consisting of partners George Ashmead Ferris (1859-1948) and his son Lehman "Monk" Ferris (1893-1996).  The partnership lasted from just 1928 to 1932;  both father and son however were individually prominent.

A number of the firm's or individual Ferris works are listed on the U.S. National Register of Historic Places.
Lehman served as Reno, Nevada's first building inspector and participated in efforts to create a uniform building code nationwide.  He also served as the first chairman of the Nevada State Board of Architecture.

Works by the firm or either partner include:
Alpha Tau Omega Fraternity House, 205 University Terrace, Reno, NV (Ferris, Lehman "Monk"), NRHP-listed
Carson City Civic Auditorium, 813 N. Carson St., Carson City, Nevada (Ferris, Lehman A.), NRHP-listed
El Cortez Hotel, 239 W. 2nd St., Reno, Nevada (Ferris, George A., & Son), NRHP-listed
Governor's Mansion, 606 Mountain St., Carson City, Nevada (Ferris, George A.), NRHP-listed
Lander County High School, 130 Sixth St., Austin, Nevada (Ferris, George A., and Son), NRHP-listed
Las Vegas High School Academic Building and Gymnasium, 315 S. Seventh St., Las Vegas, Nevada (Ferris, George A. & Son), NRHP-listed
McKinley Park School, Riverside Dr. and Keystone Ave., Reno, Nevada (Ferris, George), NRHP-listed

References 

Architecture firms based in Nevada
1928 establishments in Nevada
1930s disestablishments in Nevada
Companies based in Reno, Nevada
American companies established in 1928
American companies disestablished in 1932